is a popular Yōshoku dish consisting of meat, usually chicken or pork, and mixed vegetables, onion, carrot, potato and cabbage, cooked in thick white roux. The vegetables are sauteed before the meat is added with some water. The surface fats are removed by degreasing and then the roux is added. It is common in Japan to use ready-made roux, as for making Japanese curry, which comes in a block from a box. The roux though can also be cooked from scratch. The hard paste roux melts from the heat and blends with the water to create a thick stew. Milk can also be used as replacement for water, to make the stew more creamy.

See also
 List of Japanese soups and stews
 Glico

References

Japanese soups and stews
Japanese fusion cuisine